Elections to Elmbridge Borough Council to elect one third of its council were held on 22 May 2014, the date of the 2014 United Kingdom local elections.

Results

One seat changed hands: a Conservative candidate won a Molesey Residents' Association councillor's seat.  The Conservative group thus slightly extended their overall majority which was gained after three years of No Overall Control in the 2008 local election.  That administration succeeded a Walton Society/Residents' Association coalition who therefore grouped themselves under the Independent header which governed the borough from 2002 until 2005.  The Liberal Democrats who form the other group on the council held their two seats up for re-election in this electoral year.  As with all parties other than the Conservatives they did not field a candidate in every ward.

References 

2014 English local elections
2014
2010s in Surrey